Nicholas Hoult is an English actor.

Filmography

Film

Television

Music videos

Video games

Commercials

Awards and nominations

References

Hoult, Nicholas
Hoult, Nicholas
British filmographies